Louis J. Lefkowitz (July 3, 1904  – June 20, 1996) was an American lawyer and politician.  He served as the Attorney General of New York State for 22 years. He was a Republican.

Early life and education 
Lefkowitz was born to a Jewish family in Manhattan, New York City, the son of Samuel Lefkowitz and Mollie (Isaacs) Lefkowitz, and brother of Leo Lefkowitz and Helen (Lefkowitz) Schlesinger.Ferretti, Fred, "The Last of the Street Politicians", The New York Times, January 21, 1979.

He attended P.S. 188 and then The High School of Commerce in New York City and graduated at the age of 16 in 1921.Goodman, George, Jr., "High School Notes", The New York Times, December 15, 1973 He didn't attend college after high school but worked full-time as a law clerk and served summonses. While still working full-time, he went on to study law in the evening division of Fordham Law School In New York City beginning in 1922.Cooper, Robert H., Jr. "ORAL HISTORY: Louis Lefkowitz", Fordham University School of Law, March 3, 1989.

Lefkowitz graduated from Fordham Law School in 1925.

Political career
Lefkowitz  was a member of the New York State Assembly (New York Co., 6th D.) in 1928, 1929 and 1930. In 1935, he became a municipal judge.

In 1957, Lefkowitz was elected by the New York State Legislature as New York Attorney General, to succeed Jacob K. Javits, who resigned after being elected to the U.S. Senate the previous year. Lefkowitz was re-elected in 1958, 1962, 1966, 1970 and 1974, holding the office for 22 years, the longest tenure since the office was established in 1777.

In 1961, he was the Republican candidate for Mayor of New York City. He lost to the then sitting mayor, Democrat Robert F. Wagner Jr.

Lefkowitz was a delegate to the 1944, 1948, 1960, and 1964 Republican National Conventions, and an alternate delegate to the 1956 Republican National Convention. He was a moderate or even liberal Republican and part of the Thomas E. Dewey and Nelson A. Rockefeller faction of the New York Republican Party.

Lefkowitz died from Parkinson's disease at his home in Manhattan.

The Louis J. Lefkowitz State Office Building at 80 Centre Street in the Civic Center district of Manhattan was named for him.

Personal life 
On June 14, 1931, he married Helen Schwimmer (1908–1986). They had a son, Stephen Lefkowitz, a lawyer and professor of Law, and a daughter, Joan Lefkowitz Feinbloom.

References
Notes

External links
 "Louis J. Lefkowitz, 22-Year Attorney General, Dies at 91" (obituary), The New York Times, June 21, 1996
 "MRS. LOUIS J. LEFKOWITZ" (Helen Lefkowitz obituary), The New York Times, March 19, 1986

1904 births
1996 deaths
Neurological disease deaths in New York (state)
Deaths from Parkinson's disease
Jewish American state legislators in New York (state)
Republican Party members of the New York State Assembly
New York State Attorneys General
Politicians from Manhattan
20th-century American politicians
20th-century American Jews